Imerinaea is a monotypic genus of flowering plants from the orchid family, Orchidaceae.  The single species is Imerinaea madagascarica and is endemic to northern Madagascar. It is lithophilic and grows in shady areas under trees among mosses and lichens.

See also 
 List of Orchidaceae genera

References 

 Pridgeon, A.M., Cribb, P.J., Chase, M.A. & Rasmussen, F. eds. (1999). Genera Orchidacearum 1. Oxford Univ. Press.
 Pridgeon, A.M., Cribb, P.J., Chase, M.A. & Rasmussen, F. eds. (2001). Genera Orchidacearum 2. Oxford Univ. Press.
 Pridgeon, A.M., Cribb, P.J., Chase, M.A. & Rasmussen, F. eds. (2003). Genera Orchidacearum 3. Oxford Univ. Press
 Berg Pana, H. 2005. Handbuch der Orchideen-Namen. Dictionary of Orchid Names. Dizionario dei nomi delle orchidee. Ulmer, Stuttgart
 Pridgeon, A.M., Cribb, P.J., Chase, M.A. & Rasmussen, F. eds. (2009). Genera Orchidacearum 5. Oxford Univ. Press.

Eulophiinae
Orchids of Madagascar
Endemic flora of Madagascar
Monotypic Epidendroideae genera
Eulophiinae genera
Plants described in 1924